Carl Smith (1962 – 1 January 2010) was a male British lightweight rower.

Rowing career
Smith was a four times World Champion winning a gold medal in 1986, 1991 at the 1991 World Rowing Championships in Vienna with the lightweight men's four, 1992 and 1994.

He represented England and won two bronze medals in the single scull and doubles scull with Allan Whitwell, at the 1986 Commonwealth Games in Edinburgh, Scotland.

Personal life
He went to school at West Bridgford Comprehensive School. He died in 2010 in a car accident.

References

1962 births
2010 deaths
British male rowers
World Rowing Championships medalists for Great Britain
Commonwealth Games medallists in rowing
Commonwealth Games bronze medallists for England
Rowers at the 1986 Commonwealth Games
People educated at West Bridgford School
Medallists at the 1986 Commonwealth Games